Julia Childs (born 1962 in St Albans) is a British playwright who has won first- and second-place awards internationally.

Her debut play Home Sweet Soweto Home won first prize in the BBC African Performance competition. Professor Wole Soyinka awarded Childs joint-second place in African Performance 2010 with The Coffin Factory. Both plays were produced by BBC and broadcast on the BBC World Service.

References

Living people
1962 births
British dramatists and playwrights